Horse Creek may refer to:

Australia 
 Horse Creek, Queensland, a locality in the Rockhampton Region

United States

Locations
 Horse Creek, California, an unincorporated community
 Horse Creek, South Dakota, a census-designated place
 Horse Creek, Wisconsin, an unincorporated community
 Horse Creek, Wyoming, an unincorporated community
 Horse Creek Valley,  an area along Horse Creek, a tributary of the Savannah River

Waterways
 Horse Creek (Tombigbee River tributary), a tributary of the Tombigbee River in Alabama
 Horse Creek (California),  a tributary of Ulatis Creek in Solano County
 Horse Creek (Colorado), a tributary of the Arkansas River
 Horse Creek (Cedar Creek tributary), a stream in Missouri
 Horse Creek (James River tributary), a stream in Missouri
 Horse Creek (Little River tributary), a stream in Hoke County, North Carolina
 Horse Creek (Drowning Creek tributary), a stream in Moore County, North Carolina
 Horse Creek (McKenzie River tributary), a stream in Oregon
 Horse Creek (Tennessee River tributary), a stream in Tennessee

See also

 
 Horse Creek Bridge (disambiguation)
 Horse (disambiguation)
 Creek (disambiguation)